Kagura can refer to several things:

Ceremonies 
Kagura - a particular type of traditional Shinto ritual dance.

Fictional characters 
Kagura (Inuyasha), a character in the manga series Inuyasha
Kagura Mutsuki, a character from the BlazBlue series.
Kagura Tsuchimiya, the protagonist of Ga-rei
Kagura, a Demon Love Spell character
Kagura Sohma (Sōma Kagura), a Fruits Basket character
Kagura, an Azumanga Daioh character
Ten'nōzu Kagura, a Speed Grapher character
Chizuru Kagura, a King of Fighters character
Maki Kagura, a King of Fighters character
Kagura, a Gintama character
Mayo Kagura, a My-HiME Destiny character
Kagura Izumi, a Ressha Sentai ToQger character
Kagura from Senran Kagura video game franchise
Kagura from Mobile Legends: Bang Bang mage hero of moba mobile video game

Other
Kagura (band), an indie rock band from Northern Ireland
Kagrra, a Japanese rock band
Kagura (ethnic group), an ethnic group in Tanzania.